The R464 road, also called the Kileely Road, is a regional road in Ireland, located in County Clare and County Limerick.

References

Regional roads in the Republic of Ireland
Roads in County Clare
Roads in County Limerick